Jisr al-Safra (Arabic: جسر الصفراء) is a Syrian village in the Qatana District of the Rif Dimashq Governorate. According to the Syria Central Bureau of Statistics (CBS), Jisr al-Safra had a population of 704 in the 2004 census.

References

External links

Populated places in Qatana District